Sajid Hussain (16 January 1981 – 2020) was a Pakistani journalist and the founder and chief editor of the online news site, the Balochistan Times. He went missing on 2 March 2020 and his body was found in the Fyris River on 23 April 2020. Swedish police ruled out any foul play, ruling that cause of death was drowning. An autopsy indicated that he died either by suicide or an accident.

Background
Hussain was an ethnic Baloch. He started his journalist career in the Pakistani newspapers, including Daily Times and The News International. In 2012, he wrote a series of reports on "enforced disappearances and human rights violations in Balochistan". Following a police raid, interrogations and alleged death threats, he fled the country, sought political asylum and lived in exile in Sweden since 2017. In 2015, he started the online magazine, the Balochistan Times,.

Death
Hussain went missing on 2 March 2020 and was found dead in the Fyris River just north of Uppsala, Sweden on 23 April. The body's identity became clear on 30 April. At the time of his death, Sajid Hussain was pursuing a master's of arts in Iranian languages at Uppsala University where he was also teaching Balochi language on part-time basis.

Investigation
Swedish police said that they had launched a murder investigation, but suspicions of foul play weakened following an autopsy. Hussain's autopsy indicated he could have committed suicide or his death was an accident. Swedish police ruled out any "visible wrongdoing" and the cause of death of Hussain was ruled to be drowning. Later Swedish prosecution authority closed its murder investigation as they no longer suspect a crime has taken place.

References

1981 births
2020 deaths
Baloch journalists
Pakistani journalists
Pakistani male journalists
People from Kech District
Uppsala University alumni